The 1992–93 season was Stoke City's 86th season in the Football League and 4th in the third tier now known as the Second Division following the formation of the Premier League.

After a successful 1991–92 season which saw Stoke win the Football League Trophy and reach the play-offs the team went one better in 1992–93 as they claimed the Second Division title in fine style breaking the club's unbeaten record after going 25 league matches without defeat. Stoke collected 93 points from 138 on offer and racked up an impressive +39 goal difference as the club returned to the second tier.

Season review

League
With the formation of the Premier League in 1992 Stoke found themselves playing in the Second Division, still the third tier of English football. Following their excellent season in the previous campaign everyone was excited for the 1992–93 season to start and no more so than Lou Macari who signed Kevin Russell from Leicester. Stoke began their league season away at Hull City and things didn't go according to plan the "Tigers" winning 1–0.

But then things started to improve, Wigan Athletic were beaten and draws were gained at tricky Exeter and Plymouth. Stoke then beat traditional rivals West Bromwich Albion 4–3 which sparked a record breaking run of results. Stoke began to score goals on a regular basis and come the end of October, after 14 matches Stoke were in second position and after a 3–1 win away at Blackpool on 21 November Stoke went top and they were to remain there until the end of the season taking the league title and with it a return to the second tier. A tremendous run of 25 league games without defeat from 5 September 1992 to 20 February 1993, creating a new club record, Leyton Orient ending that with a single goal victory at Brisbane Road. The average attendance had risen by 3,000 to 16,556 and Mark Stein ran away with the goalscoring hitting 33 goals with 26 coming in the league.

FA Cup
Stoke drew local rivals Port Vale in the first round and after a 0–0 draw at the Victoria Ground, Vale went on to win the replay 3–1 at a waterlogged Vale Park which saw a shot from Dave Regis that was heading for goal get stuck in the mud.

League Cup
After easily beating Preston North End Stoke lost against Cambridge United.

League Trophy
Stoke went in the League trophy as holders and but for the second time this season Port Vale knocked Stoke out of a cup competition at the semi final stage.

Final league table

Results

Legend

Football League Second Division

FA Cup

League Cup

League Trophy

Isle of Man Trophy

Friendlies

Squad statistics

References

Stoke City F.C. seasons
Stoke